Hardeep Singh Dang is a member of the legislative assembly (MLA) from Suwasra, Mandsaur in Madhya Pradesh, India. He is a member of the Bharatiya Janata Party.He was sworn in as a cabinet minister in the Shivraj Singh Chouhan government of Madhya Pradesh on 2 July 2020.

He resigned from the assembly membership and consequently from Indian National Congress, citing in a letter, 'ignorance from his party' and then joined BJP on March 21, 2020 along with 17 Scindia Supporters and 4 others.

References

See also
Madhya Pradesh Congress Committee

Living people
Indian National Congress politicians
1968 births
Bharatiya Janata Party politicians from Madhya Pradesh